Ein Siniya (‘Ayn Sîniyâ) is a small Palestinian village of over 700 people in the Ramallah and al-Bireh Governorate,  north of Ramallah, and approximately 1km northeast from Jifna. It lies in a valley surrounded with olive and fig-terraces.

Location
'Ein Siniya is  located (horizontally)  8km east of Ramallah. It is bordered by Yabrud and Ein Yabrud to the east, 'Atara and Silwad  to the north, Jifna and Birzeit  to the west, and Jifna and Dura al-Qar' to the south.

History

Antiquity
Numerous rock-cut tombs have been found around the village.

Clermont-Ganneau identified Ein Siniya with Biblical Jeshanah and Isana of Josephus, but modern  authors place that at Kh. el-Burn.

Ein Siniya has usually been identified as the Crusader village Aineseins,  which was one of 21 villages given by King Godfrey as a fief to the canons of the Holy Sepulchre. However, C. N.  Johns, writing in  1939, thought that  Aineseins was located by Tel Beit Shemesh.

Claude Reignier Conder and Herbert Kitchener wrote in 1882 that a small Crusader fort appeared to have been situated there, however, this has not been verified by later sources. Additionally, Conder and Kitchener mention a tomb with a Hebrew inscription that was discovered at the location, as well as a gateway adorned door that they thought was of Arab Christian origin.

Ottoman era
During Palestine's rule by the Ottoman Empire (16th-19th centuries), Ein Siniya was located in the sheikhdom of Bani Zeid, in the Jerusalem Sanjak. In 1556, it was the smallest village in the sheikhdom, having under ten households.  Potsherds from the early  Ottoman period have been found. In the Ottoman census of 1596, Ein Siniya was a part of the nahiya ("subdistrict") of Jerusalem, which was under the administration of the Jerusalem Sanjak. The village had a population of 12 households, all Muslim, and  paid taxes on wheat, barley, olives, vineyards, fruit trees, occasional revenues, beehives and/or goats; a total of  4,300  akçe.

Prior to the 1834 peasants' revolt, Ein Siniya belonged to the Bani Murrah tribe. After the revolt, the sheikhs were appointed by Ibrahim Pasha. In 1838, Biblical scholar Edward Robinson  found the village to be surrounded with vineyards and fruit-trees. There were also gardens of vegetables, watered from a well.   It was further noted as Muslim village,   located in the Beni Murrah district, north of Jerusalem.

In 1870, the French explorer Victor Guérin visited the village, which he found to have two hundred inhabitants. Socin found from an official Ottoman village list from about  the same year  (1870) that  Ein Siniya had 57 houses and a population of 218, though  the population count included men only.

In 1882, the  PEF's Survey of Western Palestine   described Ain Sinia as a small village, but  of "undoubted antiquity."  Early in the 20th century, Ain Sinya  was "practically" the property of a wealthy Arab native of Jerusalem who influenced authorities to build a carriage road next to Ein Siniya to benefit the village. In 1907 the population was Muslim. At the same time it was noted that Ein Siniya, unlike other Arab villages in the area, grew mulberry and walnut trees in abundance instead of olive or fig groves.

In 1896 the population of  'Ain Sinja was estimated to be about 237 persons.

Moshe Sharett, later Prime Minister of Israel, lived in Ein Siniya for two years, in  1906-1908, after the family's immigration from Ukraine. During this period, Sharett's father and two uncles ran a farmstead which included an olive-oil press and a flour mill.

British Mandate era
In the 1922 census of Palestine, conducted by the British Mandate authorities,   the population numbered 114, Muslims,  increasing in  the 1931 census to  288, in 59 inhabited houses. 15 villagers were  Christian, the rest Muslim.

In 1945 statistics  Ein Siniya had a population of 330 inhabitants; 310 Muslims and 20 Christians,  and a total land area of 2,724 dunams, most of which was Arab-owned. Its built-up area consisted of 21 dunams, while 2,404 dunams were cultivated.   1,856 dunams  were allocated  for plantations and irrigable land, and  548 for cereals.

Jordanian era
In the wake of the 1948 Arab–Israeli War, and after the 1949 Armistice Agreements, Ein Siniya  came  under Jordanian rule.

The Jordanian census of 1961 found 431 inhabitants.

Post-1967
Since the Six-Day War in 1967, Ein Siniya  has been under Israeli occupation.

After the 1995 accords, 2,578 dunum of  village land is defined as  Area B land, while the remaining 618 dunum is defined as Area C.

Much of the population fled during the war and only by 1982 did the population reach roughly what it was in 1945, 333. It grew to 482 in 1987, and then 533 in the census carried out by the Palestinian Central Bureau of Statistics (PCBS) a decade later. The main cause of the growth of Ein Siniya, which was nearly empty after the 1967 war, was an influx of Palestinian refugees, who by 1997 constituted over half of the population (52.3%). According to the PCBS, Ein Siniya had a population of 702 in 2004, rising to 753 in mid-year 2006. In the 2007 PCBS census, there were 711 people living in the town.

'Ein Siniya residents are from several families, mainly the Ghanimah, Abu Al-Sheikh, Samhan, Ma'alla, Khater, Abu al Hajj, Dar Ali, Bazrooq, Mousa and Al Hallaq families ('Ein Siniya Village Council, 2011).

References

Bibliography

 Amiry, S., Nazmi Al-Jubeh, Andrea Bräuning, Jürgen Frick: Das „Museum of Memory” in Ain Sinya. Beispiel für die Denkmalpflege in Palästina. In: Denkmalpflege in Baden-Württemberg, 32 (2003), vol. 4, pp. 345–353 (PDF)

External links
Welcome To 'Ayn Siniya
Survey of Western Palestine, Map 14:    IAA, Wikimedia commons 
   Ein Siniya, factsheet,  Applied Research Institute–Jerusalem (ARIJ)
Ein Siniya, Village profile, ARIJ
  Ein Sinya, aerial photo, ARIJ
Locality Development Priorities and Needs in 'Ein Siniya Village, ARIJ

Villages in the West Bank